Little Black River may refer to:

 Little Black River (Alaska)
 Little Black River (Current River tributary), a stream in southern Missouri and northern Arkansas
 Little Black River (Saint John River), a tributary of the Saint John River in Quebec and northern Maine
 Little Black River (Cheboygan County), a tributary of Lake Huron in Michigan
 Little Black River (Gogebic County), a tributary of the Black River in Michigan
 Little Black River (Minnesota), a tributary of the Black River
 Little Black River, a left tributary of the Black River (Abitibi River), in Ontario
 Little Black River, a left tributary of the Black River (Thunder Bay District), in Ontario
 (Little) Black River First Nation,  an Ojibwa First Nation located on the eastern shore of Lake Winnipeg

See also

 Big Black River (disambiguation)
 Black River (disambiguation)